The Catalogue is a box set consisting of the eight albums by German electronic music band Kraftwerk that were released from 1974 to 2003. All albums are digitally remastered, with most of the cover art redesigned, including rare photographs in the liner notes that were not part of each album's original release.

Contents and formats

The albums included in the boxed set are the following:
 Autobahn (1974)
 Radio-Activity (German title: Radio-Aktivität; 1975)
 Trans-Europe Express (German title: Trans Europa Express; 1977)
 The Man-Machine (German title: Die Mensch-Maschine; 1978)
 Computer World (German title: Computerwelt; 1981)
 Electric Café (1986; here given its originally intended name of Techno Pop)
 The Mix (1991)
 Tour de France Soundtracks (2003; now titled Tour de France)

Due to licensing issues, three of these albums—Computer World, Electric Cafe (now re-christened with its original working title of Techno Pop) and The Mix—are unavailable in the United States except as part of the boxed set (although they can now be found on streaming services such as Spotify). The Techno Pop album contains a slightly revised track listing from its predecessor Electric Cafe: the song "The Telephone Call" now appears in its much shorter single mix, and that single's B-side remix, "House Phone", has been added as a proper album track. As with previous Kraftwerk releases, the collection is distributed in two versions: English-language vocal tracks for international distribution and another (Der Katalog) with German-language vocal tracks. The boxed set contains eight CDs in mini-vinyl card wallet packaging, plus individual large-format booklets. On October 5, 2009, Kraftwerk released several remastered albums with redesigned artwork.

Release
The boxed set was initially planned for release in 2004 on compact disc and vinyl format and was distributed as a promotional boxed set on compact disc. Copies were often sold on eBay for high prices. An actual release date was not announced and the project remained unreleased for years, despite having a page on the Kraftwerk website during this time.

The individual remastered albums were eventually made available on compact disc in October 2009, while an 8-CD boxed set and heavyweight vinyl versions followed in November. Due to licensing restrictions imposed by Warner Music Group, the albums Computer World, Techno Pop (formerly known as Electric Café) and The Mix have only been made available in the US from Astralwerks Records as a part of the box set, or individually as imports (the iTunes Store also carries the complete remastered catalogue as well). The collection may also be purchased in three different configurations from the group's Klingklang Shop; with a T-shirt, with a set of mouse pads or all three items together.

Proposed second boxed set
In 2006 Ralf Hütter suggested that a second Kraftwerk boxed set containing the band's first three albums would be released but there has been no official news regarding such a project or an amended release date since.

Reception

The box set received universal acclaim from critics.

References

External links
 Official announcement, including a diagram of the box contents
 Unofficial unboxing video, showing the box contents

2009 compilation albums
Astralwerks compilation albums
Electronic compilation albums
EMI Records compilation albums
German-language albums
Kling Klang Studio albums
Kraftwerk albums